Straten is a town in the Mallee Ward of the Shire of Buloke, Victoria that was also previously called Stratton.

Speed East post office was in the locality and was opened on 15 January 1923, renamed Stratton on 15 April 1924 and was closed on 12 July 1952.

References